Thomas Mullins may refer to:

Thomas Mullins, 1st Baron Ventry (1736–1824), supporter of the Union of Great Britain and Ireland
Thomas Mullins (British Army officer) (died 1823), son of the 1st Baron, cashiered for his actions at the Battle of New Orleans
Thomas de Moleyns, 3rd Baron Ventry (1786–1868), grandson of the 1st Baron, British soldier
Thomas Mullins (Irish politician) (1903–1978), Irish politician
Thomas Mullins (racehorse trainer), see 2008 Grand National